Orea is a Greek word that means beautiful or great in height, see Panorea.
Orea is a Spanish word that means to air.

OREA or Orea may also refer to:

Organizations 
 OREA, a worker's union, see Air Georgian
 Diocese of Orea, see Archdiocese of Santa Severina
 Office of Russian and European Analysis
 Oral Roberts Evangelistic Association, a Pentecostal ministry founded by Oral Roberts
 Ontario Real Estate Association, Canada
 Oxford Real Estate Advisors, an investment advisory firm, see Oxford Development
 OREA Hotels, a hotel chain in the Czech Republic

Television, film, music, and art 
  Zoi Ine Orea (Life is Wonderful), see Los Roldán
 I orea ton Athinon, The Beauty of Athens, see Sperantza Vrana
 I orea tou kourea, see Giannis Gionakis

Places 
 Orea, a municipality in Guadalajara, Castile-La Mancha, Spain

People

Non-fictional 
 Orea (Orio), King of Ulietea, see Poedua
 Mary Orea "Molly" (Pickett) Jackson, see Claiborne Fox Jackson
 Guillermo Orea Jr., see Muchachitas
 Guillermo Orea, see El Esqueleto de la señora Morales
 Juan de Orea, see Granada Cathedral
 Omar Chewe Orea Ochoa, see Adolfo Constanzo
 Gallerie Orea, see Vannetta Seecharran

Fictional 
 Orea, a figure in Gnostic cosmology, see Norea